The 35th National Film Awards, presented by Ministry of Information, Bangladesh to felicitate the best of Bangladeshi Cinema released in the year 2010. The government announced the names of 25 artistes and technicians for the National Film Award 2010 in recognition of their outstanding contributions to the country's film industry. Prime minister Sheikh Hasina handed over the 'National Film Awards – 2010' to the winners. The government has decided to observe 3 April as National Film Day from this year. The National Film Award 2010 was held at the Bangabandhu International Conference Centre, Dhaka.

List of winners
Awards were given in 25 categories this year.

Merit Awards

Technical Awards

Special Awards
 Lifetime Achievement Award – Anwar Hossain

Host and performance
The award giving ceremony was anchored by Riaz and Moushumi. In cultural section, a documentary based on Bangladeshi films was shown. Dancers of BTV performed with country songs. Runa Laila, Subir Nandi, Samina Chowdhury, and S I Tutul sang songs afterwards.

See also
Bachsas Film Awards
Meril Prothom Alo Awards
Ifad Film Club Award
Babisas Award

References

External links

National Film Awards (Bangladesh) ceremonies
2010 film awards
2012 awards in Bangladesh
2012 in Dhaka
April 2012 events in Bangladesh